"Funky Junky" is the third single from Australian singer Peter Andre's self-titled debut album. The song was released on 31 May 1993, through Melodian Records. The song frequently featured as background music in Australian soap opera Neighbours in 1993. "Funky Junky" peaked at number 13 on the Australian Singles Chart and was certified Gold by the Australian Recording Industry Association (ARIA).

Track listing
CD1 and cassette
 "Funky Junky" (version without rap) – 3:33
 "Funky Junky" (Mental mix) – 6:14

CD2
 "Funky Junky" (version with rap) – 3:51
 "Funky Junky" (Mental mix) – 6:14
 "Funky Junky" (instrumental) – 3:51

Charts

Weekly charts

Year-end charts

Certifications

References

1992 songs
1993 singles
Peter Andre songs
Songs written by Peter Andre